Christopher Maher Cousins (born September 27, 1960) is an American actor who has been acting in television since 1986. He is best known for playing conman Cain Rogan in forty-one episodes of the soap opera One Life to Live. Between 2009 and 2012, he played Ted Beneke in thirteen episodes of the AMC series Breaking Bad.  In 2013 and 2014, he played Victor Doyle in seven episodes of the NBC series Revolution.

Early life and education 
Cousins was born in New York City and raised in Oklahoma, where he attended Norman High School. He graduated from Boston University and relocated to New York City to act in theatre productions.

Career 
Notable film roles include David Williams in Untraceable (2008), the villain Daniel in Wicker Park (2004), Bill in The Grudge 2 (2006), and the father of the main characters in Legally Blondes. He also made an appearance on Glee on the episode "Puppet Master" He has also appeared in an episode of House, M.D. as a victim's father on an episode called "Distractions" in season 2 episode 12. In season 3 of Supernatural he played a doctor whose comatose daughter is the spirit in "Bedtime Stories". He also appeared on Criminal Minds as a trauma surgeon on an episode called "Nameless, Faceless" in season 5, episode 1. He also appeared on Designated Survivor as Senator Rouse. In 2016, he had a recurring role in Bosch as Martin Weiss, an attorney for an Armenian mobster.

Filmography

Film

Television

References

External links
 

Living people
20th-century American male actors
21st-century American male actors
Male actors from New York City
American male television actors
American male film actors
1960 births